Bruno Baptista (born 24 March 1997) is a Brazilian racing driver. He competes full-time in the Stock Car Pro Series, driving the No. 44 Toyota Corolla E210 for RCM Motorsport. He is the 2014 F4 Sudamericana champion.

Career

GP3 Series
In December 2016, Baptista partook in post-season testing with Jenzer Motorsport.

Racing record

Career summary

† As Baptista was a guest driver, he was ineligible for points.
* Season still in progress.

Complete Toyota Racing Series results 
(key) (Races in bold indicate pole position) (Races in italics indicate fastest lap)

Complete GP3 Series results
(key) (Races in bold indicate pole position) (Races in italics indicate fastest lap)

Complete Stock Car Brasil results

References

External links

1997 births
Living people
Racing drivers from São Paulo
Formula Renault Eurocup drivers
Formula Renault 2.0 Alps drivers
Formula Renault 2.0 NEC drivers
Brazilian GP3 Series drivers
Manor Motorsport drivers
MP Motorsport drivers
Stock Car Brasil drivers
Koiranen GP drivers
Fortec Motorsport drivers
DAMS drivers
FIA Motorsport Games drivers
Formula 4 drivers